Race is a 2011 Malayalam-language thriller film directed by Kukku Surendran and starring Indrajith, Kunchacko Boban, Mamta Mohandas, Baby Anikha, and Gowri Munjal. The story is based on Greg Iles's novel 24 hours. The film opened in Kerala theatres on 11 February 2011 to negative reviews. It was dubbed into Telugu as Game by Narne Media Solutions (Pvt) Limited in 2013. It was a remake of the Hindi film Deadline: Sirf 24 Ghante.

Plot
Dr. Eby John (Kunchacko Boban) is a successful cardiac surgeon, leading a happy family life with his wife Niya (Mamta Mohandas) and their lovely daughter Achu (Baby Anika). One day Eby is attending a conference in Bengualuru, a lady named Shweta (Gowri Munjal) tells him that her friends have kidnapped his daughter and his wife Niya (Mamta Mohandas) and are holding them captive in their home. It goes without saying that the child's life will be in danger if he fails to meet their demand for Rs 1 crore within twenty four hours. Hence the title "Race", denoting 'race against time'.

Cast

Indrajith as Niranjan                       
Kunchacko Boban as Dr. Eby John
Gowri Munjal as Swetha       
Mamta Mohandas as Niya
Anikha Surendran as Achu
Jagathy Sreekumar as Eldo
Geetha Vijayan
Sreejith Ravi as police commissioner
 Joju George
Manu Jose

Home video
This movie was released on DVD and Blu-ray Disc in India in 2011 and the second film was released on Blu-ray in Malayalam.

References

External links
 

2011 films
2010s Malayalam-language films
2011 thriller films
Malayalam remakes of Hindi films
Indian thriller films